William M. McFaddin (1819–1898) served in the Texas Revolution at San Jacinto. He founded a ranching empire in southeast Texas that survives today.  William P.H. Mcfaddin, James Alfred McFaddin, David H. McFaddin, John Andrew McFaddin, and Charles Walter McFaddin were his sons, and Eliza Ann (Di) McFaddin, and Elizabeth (Lizzie) McFaddin, were his daughters.

References

People from Lake Charles, Louisiana
People from Beaumont, Texas
1819 births
1898 deaths
People of the Texas Revolution